The Mouse and the Monster is a 1996-1997 American animated series created by Jerry Leibowitz for Saban Entertainment. It centered around a mouse named Chesbro, and a beatnik monster named Mo. The show was originally part of the UPN network's 1996 UPN Kids lineup alongside other Saban-produced shows, such as Bureau of Alien Detectors and The Incredible Hulk. Reruns later appeared on the Fox Family Channel. The show subsequently aired on various Disney Channels in Europe following Disney's acquisition of Saban's library of shows.

Ownership of the series passed to Disney in 2001 when Disney acquired Fox Kids Worldwide, which also includes Saban Entertainment. The series is not available on Disney+.

Plot
During what would be his final concert, the brilliant pianist Flatnoteski suffered a heart attack and died. Among the front-row visitors were Dr. Wackerstein and his wife and assistant Olga. Dr. Wackerstein immediately claimed Flatnoteski's brain so that the Doctor could create a body to place said brain in and allow Flatnoteski's genius to live on. For this purpose, Dr. Wackerstein created Mo, a cycloptic golem bearing a passing resemblance to Frankenstein's Monster. However, even without a brain, Mo had a mind and personality of his own and did not want his own newly created life to make room for a brain that wasn't his. An inhabitant of Wackerstein's castle, a mouse named Chesbro, befriended Mo and helped him to flee. Pals together, they are on the run from the mad doctor.

Characters
 Chesbro "Chez" Mouse: An ordinary yellow former lab-mouse. He is Mo's best friend and travel companion, both on the run from Dr. Wackerstein. He has a pessimistic streak, often feeling regretful for leaving a cheese factory over a laboratory job. Chez is constantly busy keeping Mo (and himself) out of trouble.
 Mo: A large blue cycloptic beatnik monster. He's cheerful, impulsive, and generally kind. Having been brought into creation rather than being born, Mo possesses a childlike fascination for things he isn't familiar with. He loves drumming on his bongos in a true beatnik fashion. His favorite food is Gumballs, especially Squid-flavored ones. He truly despises Liverwurst, from having been force-fed the stuff while a captive of the doctor, and can go on a berserk rampage if he even so much as hears the word.
 Dr. Wackerstein: A short purple man, who is a lunatic scientist with decent intentions, but insane means. He created Mo so he could place Flatnoteski's Brain inside of his skull, and when he found out Mo had escaped, he chased after him. Wackerstein also has an assistant named Olga, whom he always calls Igor; much to her chagrin, and in spite of her repeated corrections.
 Olga: A woman with a green complexion, a Slavic accent and a tall pink beehive hairstyle. She is Dr. Wackerstein's wife and assistant. Besides being a performance artist, Olga is a strange, completely inexcitable woman. She often keeps Dr. Wackerstein in line, acting as a voice of reason for his boisterous behavior. What few pleasures in life she has includes her mother's schnitzels, and interpretive dance paired with her own experimental form of music, which generally consists of a tuba playing short notes, accompanied by off-key opera singing. Her catchphrase is: "My name is Olga, you vertically challenged bupkis of a man!"
 Flatnoteski's Brain: The brilliant composer and pianist Flatnoteski has died from a heart attack, but his disembodied brain lives on. It's usually brought along with Dr. Wackerstein, riding in the toddler's seat in the back of the doctor's car. Despite being a disembodied brain, it will often express its feelings to the viewer, in the form of a thought balloon that conveys a brainwave frequency line, which changes to reflect what it's thinking, such as short words like "HELP".

Episodes

References

External links
 

UPN original programming
1990s American animated television series
1996 American television series debuts
1997 American television series endings
American children's animated comedy television series
UPN Kids
Fox Family Channel original programming
Animated television series about mice and rats
Animated television series about monsters
Television series by Saban Entertainment